Altenia wagneriella is a moth of the family Gelechiidae. It is found in Croatia, North Macedonia, Greece, Serbia and on Cyprus. It is also present in Turkey, Iran, Tajikistan and Turkmenistan.

References

Moths described in 1926
Altenia
Moths of Europe
Moths of Asia